Allenton, Wisconsin is an unincorporated census-designated place in the town of Addison, Wisconsin in Washington County, Wisconsin. It is located near the intersection of Wisconsin Highway 33 and Interstate 41. It is on a line of the Canadian National Railway, parent company of the Wisconsin Central Ltd. railroad company. Allenton has a post office with ZIP code 53002. As of the 2020 census, its population was 859.

Geography
Allenton is located at latitude 43.421 and longitude -88.341. The elevation is 958 feet. The Rock River cuts through the town.

Demographics

Economy
Brooks Stevens Design Associates, a product design firm, is based in Allenton, as is Zuern Building Products, a chain of lumber yards in Wisconsin. Maysteel and Boyd are also situated there.

Education
Allenton Elementary School, which is part of the School District of Slinger, is located in the community.

Notable residents
Alfred G. Becker, Wisconsin State Representative
John Reiser, former general manager of Roush Racing NASCAR Busch Series and NASCAR Craftsman Truck Series race shops
Robbie Reiser, former NASCAR driver, Winston Cup championship crew chief, team manager at Roush Fenway Racing

Images

Notes

Census-designated places in Wisconsin
Census-designated places in Washington County, Wisconsin